Patterson Township is one of the twenty townships of Darke County, Ohio, United States. The 2010 census found 1,365 people in the township, 967 of whom lived in the unincorporated portions of the township.

Geography
Located in the northeastern corner of the county, it borders the following townships:
Marion Township, Mercer County - north
McLean Township, Shelby County - northeast
Cynthian Township, Shelby County - east
Loramie Township, Shelby County - southeast corner
Wayne Township - south
York Township - southwest
Wabash Township - west

Two incorporated villages are located in Patterson Township: Osgood in the northwest, and Yorkshire in the west.

Name and history
It is the only Patterson Township statewide.

Patterson Township was established in 1841.

Government
The township is governed by a three-member board of trustees, who are elected in November of odd-numbered years to a four-year term beginning on the following January 1. Two are elected in the year after the presidential election and one is elected in the year before it. There is also an elected township fiscal officer, who serves a four-year term beginning on April 1 of the year after the election, which is held in November of the year before the presidential election. Vacancies in the fiscal officership or on the board of trustees are filled by the remaining trustees.  The current trustees are Ken Bohman, Samual Pohlman, and Steven Puthoff, and the clerk is Paul Albers.

References

External links
County website

Townships in Darke County, Ohio
Townships in Ohio